Artistic gymnastics was contested at the 2017 Summer Universiade from August 19 to 23, and rhythmic gymnastics was contested from August 27 to 29, both events was held at the Taipei Nangang Exhibition Center in Taipei, Taiwan.

Medal summary

Medal table

Artistic gymnastics

Men's events

Women's events

Rhythmic gymnastics

Individual

Group

References

External links
2017 Summer Universiade – Artistic gymnastics
2017 Summer Universiade – Rhythmic gymnastics
Result book – Artistic gymnastics
Result book – Rhythmic gymnastics

 
2017 in gymnastics
2017 Summer Universiade events
Gymnastics at the Summer Universiade